Jack Flanagan (3 February 1902 – 4 May 1989) was an English footballer who played as a centre forward for Manchester United, Tranmere Rovers, Chorley, Barrow, Wigan Borough, Burscough, Lancaster, Rhyl and Leyland Motors.

References

Manchester United F.C. players
Tranmere Rovers F.C. players
Chorley F.C. players
Barrow A.F.C. players
Wigan Borough F.C. players
Burscough F.C. players
Lancaster City F.C. players
Rhyl F.C. players
Leyland Motors F.C. players
1902 births
1989 deaths
English footballers
Association football forwards
Stalybridge Celtic F.C. players
Northwich Victoria F.C. players